Luv U   is a Filipino teen sitcom series and aired every Sunday Afternoon on ABS-CBN's Yes Weekend! block. The show premiered on February 19, 2012, replacing Growing Up. The show ended on January 17, 2016, and was replaced by Celebrity Playtime.

Overview 
The series is about lessons in love through the eyes of six teen students of Lamberto Uy Villarama University or LUV U as they experience the highs and lows of being in love at a very young age.

In the first season, the show featured former Goin' Bulilit kids Miles Ocampo, Kiray Celis, CJ Navato and Igi Boy Flores, with singing sensation Rhap Salazar, Angeli Gonzales, and newbie teen actor Marco Gumabao. The group faces dilemmas in their relationships with friends and families as well as at school but together they work together and overcome these.

In the second season, the show featured another group of former Goin' Bulilit kids: Alexa Ilacad, Nash Aguas, Sharlene San Pedro, Jairus Aquino, Mika dela Cruz, Kobi Vidanes, and Sophia Baars as newbies in the fictional university. Some former cast members from the previous season also made a return namely Smokey Manaloto, Bentong and many more. Newly added casts are also added like Eda Nolan and Alora Sasam.

The new season has a more serious tone, it focuses not only on love but also the struggles and dilemmas of modern-day Filipino teenagers face such as bullying, friendship fall-outs, a first break-up, studying difficulties, family acceptance and other real-life high school issues.

Episodes

Cast and characters

Main cast

Supporting cast

Guest cast

 Ella Cruz as Mariana
 Ivan Dorschner as Evan "Tisoy" Escence
 Liza Soberano as Pia
 Trina Legaspi as Ali
 Mikylla Ramirez as Michelle
 Kean Cipriano as himself
 Michael Pangilinan as himself/Singer of Pare Mahal Mo Raw Ako on Max and JB scene
 Francis Magundayao as Andrew Ford Pineda
 Joshua Garcia as Dionard
 Loisa Andalio as Cheska
 Arvic Rivero as Bryan
 Atoy Co as Coach Totoy Co
 Mimi Aringo as Ms. Francine Fajardo
 Thou Reyes as Director
 Karen Dematera as Yaya
 Dominic Roque as Joel Velasquez
 Jane Oineza as Joey
 John Manalo as Jim
 Marissa Sanchez as Melanie Bernardo
 Maricar Reyes as Olive Jalbuena
 Rachel Anne Daquis as Nikki Vergara
 Pamu Pamorada as Nanetta
 Manolo Pedrosa as Jaspjizaer Fernandez
 Precious Lara Quigaman as Lisa Domingo
 Ana Roces as Jennifer Sevillamayor
 Stefan Alino as Matteo
 Elisse Joson as Divine
 Karen Bordador as Nikita Ponti
 Grae Fernandez as Carter
 Mutya Johanna Datul as Dina Binibini
 Viveika Ravanes as Madam Amor
 Cheena Crab as Charley Mariquit (crossover in the film Etiquette for Mistresses)
 Devy Amor as Devy
 Richard Gomez
 Sofia Andres as Bea Tipol
 Rhed Bustamante as Liza Maristela (crossover in the TV series FlordeLiza)
 Carlos Maceda as Liza's father (His character appearance was similar to Gener in FlordeLiza)
 Iza Calzado
 MJ Lastimosa as Ms. MJ
 Myrtle Sarrosa as Krista
 Young JV as Charlie
 Emman Nimedez† as Emman Abenida

Awards and nominations

See also
List of programs broadcast by ABS-CBN
List of programs aired by ABS-CBN

References

External links
 
 
 

Philippine comedy television series
2010s teen sitcoms
ABS-CBN original programming
2012 Philippine television series debuts
2016 Philippine television series endings
Filipino-language television shows
Television series by Star Creatives